The Royal Academy of Fine Arts of Brussels, is an art school established in Brussels, Belgium. It was founded in 1711. Starting from modest beginnings in a single room in Brussels' Town Hall, it has since 1876 been operating from a former convent and orphanage in the /, which was converted by the architect . The school has played an important role in training important local artists.

History

Origins

Historically, artistic training in Brussels was organised in traditional workshops where masters would teach their skills to pupils. The masters needed to be registered with their local guild to be able to practice their craft. On 30 September 1711, the magistrate of the City of Brussels gave the guilds of painters, sculptors, weavers and other amateurs the use of a room in Brussels' Town Hall to teach drawing classes to their pupils. On 16 October of the same year, some sort of school was established at these premises to organise the classes. The school would concentrate mainly on teaching drawing.

In 1737, the Academy adopted its first rules. The city assumed some costs, including those for the models. A few decades later, disagreement broke out. The classes moved to the inn 't Gulden Hoofd and were even suspended for a while. The Bruges painter Bernard Verschoot took over the Academy's leadership and tried to put it back on the rails with a heavy hand. The Governor of the Habsburg Netherlands, Prince Charles Alexander of Lorraine, put the school under his high protection in 1762. His attention went mainly to the Department of Architecture. The school was re-established in 1768 as the Académie de Peinture, Sculpture et Architecture ("Academy of Painting, Sculpture and Architecture"), with funds raised through a public subscription. Inspiration was found in the French model. A year later, the school returned to the Town Hall. In 1795, the Academy was closed after the conquest of Brussels by the French revolutionary troops.

Resurgence under François-Joseph Navez
In 1829, the school moved into the Granvelle Palace (since demolished). One year later, François-Joseph Navez became director. He organized the school and expanded it. In 1832, it moved to the basement of the left wing of the Industrial Palace. From 1835 to 1836, Navez's plans were implemented. In 1836, the Academy was awarded the privilege to use the adjective "Royal" as part of its name. The panel painting was declared to another important department. It was based on the first golden age of Dutch painting. However, there was some time tensions at the Academy to the yet propagated neoclassical style. In addition to painting and sculpture, architectural education became more important, though it never achieved the status of a pioneering teaching and training facility.

In 1876, the Academy moved to the school buildings on the /, in what was the former Bogards' convent, which had meanwhile served as an orphanage. The architect  was able to link the whole school in the limited space of the existing ensemble. The facade was redesigned in the neoclassical style. Until today the academy is there. From 5 January 1889 women were also allowed to participate in a class for advanced students. At the end of the 19th century, was the founding of the modern LUCA Campus Sint-Lukas Brussels, a strong competition. Meanwhile, ARBA is one of the 16 art schools of the French Community of Belgium. Under the director Charles van der Stappen, the doctrine came to this university to an even greater prestige. Even literature and photography were part of the training offer.

In the European art scene around the turn of the century, Brussels drew forth in addition to his training center in the shadow of Paris. Since 1889, Brussels was the uncrowned capital of Art Nouveau, especially in architecture, which had its triumphal procession through Prof. Victor Horta. The Academy managed the step to another center of the avant-garde in the panel painting. From the Academy and its students went influence on the development of Realism, Symbolism, Impressionism, Neo-Impressionism, Post Impressionism and the newly incipient Expressionism. These were all precursors of Modern Art.

In 1912, Horta had made changes to the organisation of the school. A system of studios was created, as it was recommended by Paul Bonduelle and Émile Lambot. In 1936, the Royal Order was made to the formation of the separate Department of Architecture.

Changes in organization and teaching after 1945
In 1949, a small Department of Planning and Urban Development was established. Architectural studies got the rank of university education. In 1972, the Department of Artistic Humanities was established. In 1977, the Department of Architecture finally acquired its autonomy. In 1977, the Institute Supérieur d'Architecture Victor Horta, named after the Art Nouveau architect and former director, was founded. In 1980, the higher education of the second degree and new courses at the Academy of Fine Arts were presented. In 2009, the Faculty of Architecture of the Free University of Brussels was founded. This was done after the merger of the two schools of architecture: the School of Architecture Victor Horta (ISAVH) and the chamber of the French Community of the Higher Institute of Architecture (ISACF).

Nowadays, programs are offered for Bachelor of Arts and Master of Arts in the fields of design, art and media and offered doctoral studies, too. The Academy has been an ESA (Ecole Supérieure des Arts - Art College) with a university orientation. In addition, it is part of Royal Academies for Science and the Arts of Belgium (RASAB) which was founded in 2001. It is responsible for the task of promoting activities of the affiliated members and organizations here and coordinate. Its tasks include projects at home and abroad. The school is sometimes confused with the Royal Academies for Science and the Arts of Belgium (RASAB) and the Royal Academy of Science, Letters and Fine Arts of Belgium, both separate institutions, as well as the French Académie des Beaux-Arts in Paris, part of the Institut de France.

The faculty and alumni of ARBA
Includes some of the most famous names in Belgian painting, sculpture, and architecture:    
 James Ensor,  
 Oriane Lassus,
 René Magritte,  
 Paul Delvaux,
 Peyo, creator of The Smurfs,  
 Kali

Notable directors and professors
 Barnabé Guimard (1731–1805), architect
 Tilman-François Suys (1783–1861), architect
 François-Joseph Navez (1787–1869), Belgian neo-classical painter.
 Louis Gallait (1810–1887), painter
 Eugène Simonis (1810–1893), sculptor
 Jean-François Portaels (1818–1895), Belgian painter
 Charles van der Stappen (1843–1910), sculptor
 Jef Lambeaux (1852–1908), sculptor
 Jacques de Lalaing (1858–1917), sculptor and painter
 Victor Horta (1861–1947), architect
 Paul Saintenoy (1862–1952), architect
Henri van Dievoet (1869–1931), architect
 Alfred Bastien (1873–1955), sculptor
 Léon Devos (1897–1974), painter

Gallery of works by notable teachers and directors

Some well-known alumni of the school
 Joseph-Pierre Braemt (1796–1864), medalist
 François Musin (1820–1888), Belgian painter
 Josse Impens (1840–1905), Belgian painter
 Franz Meerts (1836–1896), Belgian painter
 Emile Wauters (1846–1933), Belgian painter
 Isidore Verheyden (1846–1905), Belgian painter
 Alfred Verhaeren (1849–1924), Belgian painter
 Amédée Lynen (1852–1938), painter and illustrator
 Vincent van Gogh (1853–1890), Dutch painter
 Jan Hillebrand Wijsmuller, (1855–1925), Dutch painter
 Gustave Léonard de Jonghe (1844–1848), Belgian painter
 Jef Leempoels (1867–1935), Belgian painter
 Paul Du Bois (1859–1938), French sculptor
 James Ensor (1860–1949), Belgian painter
 Victor Rousseau (1865–1954), sculptor
 Gabriel Van Dievoet (1875–1934), painter
 Victor Servranckx (1897–1965), painter
 Paul Delvaux (1897–1994), painter
 René Magritte (1898–1967), painter
 Éliane de Meuse (1899–1993), painter
 Zhang Chongren, better known as Tschang Tschong-jen (1907–1998), sculptor and painter.
 Ben-Ami Shulman, (1907–1986), Israeli architect.
 Claude Strebelle (1917–2010), architect and builder

Gallery of works by notable students of the Académie

References

Exhibitions
 Academie Royale des Beaux-arts et Ecole des Arts decoratifs de Bruxelles. Exposition centennale 1800–1900.
 1987: Académie Royale des Beaux-Arts de Bruxelles, 275 ans d'enseignement, from 07.05 - 28.06.1987.
 2007: Art, anatomie trois siècles d'évolution des représentations du corps, Académie royale des Beaux-arts de Bruxelles, 20.04. - 16.05.2007.

Biography
 Academie Royale des Beaux-Arts de Bruxelles. 275 ans d'enseignement = 275 jaar onderwijs aan de Koninklijke Academie voor Schone Kunsten van Brussel. par Crédit Communal Bruxelles, 1987, .
 Academie Royale des Beaux-arts et École des Arts décoratifs de Bruxelles. Exposition centennale 1800–1900. catalogue of the exhibition at Bruxelles.
 A. W. Hammacher: Amsterdamsche Impressionisten en hun Kring. J.M. Meulenhoff, Amsterdam 1946.
 Wiepke Loos, Carel van Tuyll van Serooskerken: Waarde Hoer Allebé – Leven en werk van August Allebé (1838–1927). Waanders, Zwolle 1988, .
 Sheila D.  Muller: Dutch Art – An Encyclopedia. Routledge, 2013, .
 Jean Bouret: L’École de Barbizon et le paysage française au XIXe siècle. Neuchâtel 1972.
 Georges Pillement: Les Pré-Impressionistes. Zug 1972, 
 Nathalia Brodskaya: Impressionismus. Parkstone Books, New York 2007, .
 Norma Broude: Impressionismus. an international movement, 1860–1920 („World impressionism“). Dumont, Köln 2007, .
 Jean-Paul Crespelle: Les Fauves, Origines et Evolution, Office du Livre, Fribourg, und Edition Georg Popp, Würzburg 1981, .
 Jean Leymarie: Fauvismus, Editions d’Art, Albert Skira Verlag, Genève 1959.
 Kristian Sotriffer: Expressionismus und Fauvismus. Verlag Anton Schroll & Co., Wien 1971.
 Jean-Luc Rispail: Les surréalistes. Une génération entre le rêve et l'action (= Découvertes Gallimard. 109). Gallimard, Paris 2005, .
 David Britt: Modern Art - Impressionism to Post-Modernism. Thames & Hudson, London 2007, .
 Sandro Bocola: Die Kunst der Moderne. Zur Struktur und Dynamik ihrer Entwicklung. Von Goya bis Beuys. Prestel, München/ New York 1994, . (Neuauflage im Psychosozial-Verlag, Gießen, Lahn 2013)
 Sam Phillips: Moderne Kunst verstehen - Vom Impressionismus ins 21. Jahrhundert. A. Seemann Henschel, Leipzig 2013, .
 Pierre Daix, Joan Rosselet: Picasso - The Cubist Years 1907–1916., Thames & Hudson, London 1979, .
 Michael White: De Stijl and Dutch Modernism (= Critical Perspectives in Art History). Manchester University Press, . (englisch)
 Thomas, Karin: Blickpunkt der Moderne: Eine Geschichte von der Romantik bis heute. Verlag M. DuMont, Köln 2010, .

Sources 

 ARBA online history (in French)
 Rijksbureau voor Kunsthistorische Documentatie, The Hague, (RKD Netherlands Institute for Art History), Netherlands (in Dutch and English)
 Royale Museums of fine Arts of Belgium - Brussels Museums

External links
 Académie Royale des Beaux-Arts 

 
Educational institutions established in 1711
1711 establishments in the Habsburg monarchy
1711 establishments in the Holy Roman Empire